A jab is a type of punch used in the martial arts.

Jab or JAB may also refer to:
 Jab, an informal term for an injection
 JAB, an Australian punk rock band
 JAB Holding Company
 Yelmek language, also known as Jab, a Papuan language of West Papua, Indonesia
 Hyam language, ISO 639-3 code
 Jab Murray (1892–1958), American football player
 Jabiru Airport, an Australian airport with IATA code JAB
 M1074 Joint Assault Bridge (JABS) an armored military engineering vehicle based on the Abrams M1A1 main battle tank
 JAB code, a color 2D matrix barcode inspired by QR code

See also 
 JABS (Justice, Awareness and Basic Support), a vaccine-hesitant group in the UK
 The Big JAB, a network of sports radio stations in Maine, US
 YAB (disambiguation)
 Djab wurrung, an Indigenous Australian group
 Djabwurrung language, spoken by them